Greenville is a village in Outagamie County, Wisconsin. It is one of 18 communities that form the basis of the Fox Cities, the third largest metropolitan area in Wisconsin. The population was 12,619 in 2020.

History
The town was founded in 1848 as Greenville Station, and changed its name to Becker in 1879 (named after the first postmaster). Its name was changed to Greenville in 1896.

After having an initial incorporation attempt denied by the Wisconsin Incorporation Review Board, the town was able to secure a referendum for a partial incorporation in November 2020. The eastern half of the community incorporated as a village in January 2021, and successfully annexed the remnant western half of the original township in June 2021. This makes it one of the largest villages in the State of Wisconsin by area and population.

Geography
According to the United States Census Bureau, the village has a total area of 35.8 square miles (92.7 km2), of which, 35.8 square miles (92.7 km2) of it is land and 0.04 square miles (0.1 km2) of it (0.06%) is water.

The former unincorporated community of Greenville and the ghost town of Wakefield are located in the village.

Demographics
Greenville is a part of the Appleton, Wisconsin Metropolitan Statistical Area and the Appleton-Oshkosh-Neenah, Wisconsin Combined Statistical Area.

As of the census of 2000, there were 6,844 people, 2,301 households, and 1,937 families residing in the town. The population density was 191.2 people per square mile (73.8/km2). There were 2,353 housing units at an average density of 65.7 per square mile (25.4/km2). The racial makeup of the town was 98.25% White, 0.22% African American, 0.29% Native American, 0.20% Asian, 0.07% Pacific Islander, 0.39% from other races, and 0.57% from two or more races. Hispanic or Latino of any race were 1.59% of the population.

There were 2,301 households, out of which 48.4% had children under the age of 18 living with them, 75.4% were married couples living together, 5.6% had a female householder with no husband present, and 15.8% were non-families. 11.9% of all households were made up of individuals, and 2.7% had someone living alone who was 65 years of age or older. The average household size was 2.97 and the average family size was 3.24.

In the town, the population was spread out, with 32.5% under the age of 18, 5.2% from 18 to 24, 36.2% from 25 to 44, 20.9% from 45 to 64, and 5.2% who were 65 years of age or older. The median age was 34 years. For every 100 females, there were 106.1 males. For every 100 females age 18 and over, there were 103.5 males.

The median income for a household in the town was $61,381, and the median income for a family was $65,706. Males had a median income of $45,594 versus $29,360 for females. The per capita income for the town was $22,164. About 1.4% of families and 2.0% of the population were below the poverty line, including 0.9% of those under age 18 and 6.4% of those age 65 or over.

Economy
Appleton International Airport is the economic engine for the community. Many of the village's largest employers are located in business parks surrounding the airport. Air Wisconsin, the largest privately owned regional airline in the country, is headquartered in Greenville. Other businesses include School Specialty, the village's largest employer; Amazon; Federal Express; Gulfstream Aerospace; VF Corporation; Miller Electric; Plexus; Oshkosh Corporation; Badger Plug; Valley Bakers Cooperative; Sonoco Products; Asten Johnson; and Zebra Technologies.

Government

Local
Greenville is governed by an elected five-member village board consisting of a president, vice president, and three trustees. The village is represented on the Outagamie County Board with officials from Districts 32 & 33.

State

Federal

Education
Public instruction is provided by the Hortonville Area School District. The district maintains three elementary schools, two middle schools, a high school, and an independent learning center. Parochial schools include Immanuel Lutheran School and St. Mary of the Immaculate Conception Catholic School.

Public schools

Greenville Elementary School – located at W6822 Greenridge Drive, has 733 students, and carries grades Pre-K–4.
North Greenville Elementary School – located at N2468 Learning Way, carries grades Pre-K–4, and was constructed to alleviate the overcrowding in the other elementary schools.
Greenville Middle School – located at N1450 Fawnridge Drive, has 555 students, and carries grades 5–8.

Private schools

Immanuel Lutheran School – located at W7265 School Road, has 238 students, and carries grades Pre-K–8.
St. Mary of the Immaculate Conception Catholic School – located at N2387 Municipal Drive (WIS 76), has 161 students, and carries grades Pre-K–8.

The Fox Valley Technical College Public Safety Training Center is located in Greenville and provides training for law enforcement, firefighters, and emergency medical services personnel.

Religion
Churches in Greenville include:

 Christus Lutheran Church
 Faith Community United Methodist Church
 Immanuel Lutheran Church (WELS)
 Shepherd of the Hills Lutheran Church
 St. Mary of the Immaculate Conception Catholic Parish

Transportation
Appleton International Airport is located in Greenville. The airport is the headquarters for regional airline carrier, Air Wisconsin, and is the original home of Midwest Airlines, which grew out of a subsidiary of Kimberly-Clark, K-C Aviation.

The Yellowstone Trail National Historic Automobile Route also passes through Greenville.

Parks and recreation
These include:

Amber Woods – a  undeveloped woodland site; a trail system is planned for this area in the future.
Appletree Square – a  mini-park that includes a crab apple tree arboretum, access to the Greenville Trail System, and a connection to Jennerjohn Park.
Community Park – a  community park that is the village's primary site for recreational activities. It includes four ball diamonds, bleachers, a pavilion, kitchen facilities, two restroom buildings, a concessions building, play equipment, a tennis court, two half-court basketball courts, and access to the Greenville Trail System.
Field of Dreams – a  undeveloped parcel whose master plan calls for five ball diamonds, a heritage garden, soccer fields, tennis courts, basketball courts, picnic shelters, and a natural area with trails.
Glen Valley Park – a  park with a play equipment. It is not connected to the Greenville Trail System.
Elder Brook Park (previously Glen Valley Park) – a  neighborhood park with a pond and a trail system
Jennerjohn Park – a  neighborhood park with a baseball diamond, play equipment, two tennis courts, a heritage fountain, a sledding hill and ice rink, and access to the Greenville Trail System. It is also connected to Appletree Square.
Kimberly Court Park – a  mini-park that includes a conifer arboretum and access to the Greenville Trail System
Lions Park – a  community park that includes a pond, nature trails, four shelters, a 10,000-seat amphitheater, a playground, and access to the Greenville Trail System
Memorial Square – a mini-park located in front of the Greenville Public Safety Building that has memorials dedicated to area veterans, firefighters, and police officers
Pebble Ridge Park – a  neighborhood park that includes a mature woodland, pond, and walking trails

The Wisconsin Department of Natural Resources-managed Heath Van Handel Memorial Forest is located in Greenville. The 39-acre forest was previously a nursery, test area, and arboretum for the Institute of Paper Chemistry.

Greenville events include:
Annual catfish races

Points of interest
Appleton International Airport
Chaska Golf Course
Fox West YMCA
Homestead Meadows Farm
Special Memories Zoo
Yellowstone Trail National Historic Automobile Route

Images

References

External links
Town of Greenville Comprehensive Plan
Hortonville Area School District

Villages in Outagamie County, Wisconsin
Villages in Wisconsin
Appleton–Fox Cities metropolitan area